Dmitri Anatolyevich Kozlov (born 22 October 1984) is a Russian former professional footballer.

Club career
Kozlov has played in the Russian Premier League with FC Rotor Volgograd and in the Russian National Football League with FC Avangard Kursk.

External links
 
 

1984 births
Living people
Russian footballers
Russian Premier League players
Russian expatriate footballers
Russian expatriate sportspeople in Latvia
Expatriate footballers in Latvia
Expatriate footballers in Belarus
Expatriate footballers in Kazakhstan
Expatriate footballers in Moldova
FC Olimpia Volgograd players
FC Rotor Volgograd players
FC Saturn Ramenskoye players
Dinaburg FC players
FC Shinnik Yaroslavl players
FC Shakhtyor Soligorsk players
FC Akzhayik players
FC Daugava players
FC Zimbru Chișinău players
Association football forwards
Ilūkstes NSS players
FC Avangard Kursk players
FC Lukhovitsy players
Sportspeople from Kabardino-Balkaria